Mullens may refer to:
 Mullens, West Virginia
 B. J. Mullens (b. 1989), American basketball player
 Bob Mullens (1922–1989), American basketball player
 Nick Mullens (b. 1995), American football player
 Willy Mullens (1880–1952), an early Dutch producer, director, and promoter of movies

See also
Mullins (disambiguation)